European route E 763 is part of the International E-road network. It begins in Belgrade, Serbia and ends in Bijelo Polje, Montenegro. Most of E763 sections, in Serbia, are currently in the process of being upgraded, with the help of several Chinese construction companies.

Route 
  (i.e. )
  Belgrade
  Čačak
 Užice
 Nova Varoš
 
 : Barski Most - Bijelo Polje - Ribarevina

References
E763 on OpenStreetMap

External links 
 UN Economic Commission for Europe: Overall Map of E-road Network (2007)
 International E-road network

799763
E763
E763